Gustaf Carl Fredrik Boivie (27 November 1864 – 12 January 1951) was a Swedish sport shooter who competed at the 1912 Summer Olympics. He won the gold medal in the team 25 m small-bore rifle competition. He also participated in the following events:

 30 metre rapid fire pistol – eleventh place
 25 metre small-bore rifle – 15th place
 50 metre pistol – 42nd place

References

External links
profile

1864 births
1951 deaths
Swedish male sport shooters
ISSF rifle shooters
ISSF pistol shooters
Olympic shooters of Sweden
Shooters at the 1912 Summer Olympics
Olympic gold medalists for Sweden
Olympic medalists in shooting
Medalists at the 1912 Summer Olympics
Sport shooters from Stockholm
19th-century Swedish people
20th-century Swedish people
Swedish people of Walloon descent